Anne Crummer  (born 1966) is a New Zealand pop singer and songwriter of Cook Islands descent who has seen success in both a solo career and as part of various musical groups.

Biography
Crummer grew up in West Auckland. Her father, Will Crummer, a Cook Islander, was one of her strongest musical influences. Her mother Tangi is Tahitian. Crummer was a precocious singer, performing at Cook Island nightclubs and shopping mall talent quests. At the age of 9, Will Crummer tried to interest her in piano lessons and took her to singing coach Sister Mary Leo, but Crummer preferred to learn from her father. She attended Avondale High School, leaving at the age of "15 years and two months" to focus on a singing career. She appeared on the TV talent show Opportunity Knocks, won, and released her first single at the age of 16.

At the age of 18 Crummer stood out as a guest vocalist in the Netherworld Dancing Toys hit song "For Today", which was Single of the Year at the 1985 New Zealand Music Awards. She was one of the five founders of the all-female band When The Cat's Away in 1986; their cover of the 1969 Blue Mink song "Melting Pot" topped the charts in New Zealand, and the band won Group of the Year in the 1989 New Zealand Music Awards. Crummer has also performed with Herbs. Crummer released her first solo album, Language, in 1992, and her second, Seventh Wave (co-written with Barbara Griffen) in 1996. Seventh Wave was completed at Prince's studio, Paisley Park.

She recorded the Split Enz song "I Hope I Never" as part of the ENZSO project in 1996. In 1993 she had a role on New Zealand soap opera Shortland Street and recorded a single "Keeping Up The Love Thing", which featured on the show. She has performed with Australian singers John Farnham and Jimmy Barnes, and toured Australia for a month with Sting, singing on stage with him on "Let Your Soul Be Your Pilot". In 1996, she was chosen as the supporting act for Michael Jackson's New Zealand tour.

Crummer was diagnosed with dyslexia as an adult and says she cannot read or write or read music, but she credits her dyslexia with giving her a heightened sense of musical appreciation. She did one semester of Cook Islands Māori language at the University of Auckland in 2000.

Part of her work in the music industry has been mentoring in song writing and performing, including in prisons and for Smokefree Rock Quest. In 2014 she was a musical mentor for prisoners in the Māori TV series Songs from the Inside. 

On stage, she was a soloist in the musical Rent in Australia and New Zealand, and played the Killer Queen in We Will Rock You (WWRY) in Melbourne in 2005. The Australian production of WWRY toured throughout Australia, New Zealand, Asia, and South Africa. Crummer reprised her role in 2019.  She is currently working on her third album, Project Annie C.

Honours and awards 
Crummer was awarded Best Female Artist at the New Zealand Music Awards in 1993, and nominated for the same category at the ARIA Music Awards in Australia in 1996. In 2011 Crummer was awarded Senior Pacific Artist Award at the Creative New Zealand Arts Pasifika Awards. In the same year she also received a Lifetime Achievement Award at the Pacific Music Awards.

Crummer was appointed a Member of the New Zealand Order of Merit for services to music in the 2017 Queen's Birthday Honours.

In December 2021 Crummer and the other four members of When the Cats Away were inducted into the New Zealand Music Hall of Fame at the Aotearoa Music Awards in recognition of their contributions to New Zealand music.

Discography

Compilation appearances
The following albums have featured tracks by Crummer.

 (1996) – In The Neighbourhood (Warner Music) – Language
 (1998) – New Zealand Compositions (Centre For New Zealand Music) – I Hope I Never (with ENZSO)
 (2011) – Shoebox Lovesongs: the Rarotongan Music of Will Crummer (Ode Records)

Singles as main artist

Singles as featured artist

Notes

References

External links

 
 Annie Crummer (Killer Queen) – Brian May
 

1966 births
Members of the New Zealand Order of Merit
New Zealand people of Cook Island descent
New Zealand people of French Polynesian descent
21st-century New Zealand women singers
New Zealand women songwriters
Musicians from Auckland
Living people
20th-century New Zealand women singers
Māori-language singers